A56 or A-56 may refer to:

Roads
 A56 road, a road connecting Chester and Broughton in England
 A56 motorway (Italy), a road connecting Capodichino and Arco Felice in Italy
 A56 highway (Spain), a proposed road to connect Ourense and Lugo in Spain
 Bundesautobahn 56, a formerly proposed road to connect Waldfeucht and Waldbröl in Germany

Other
 Benoni Defense, a group of chess openings generally characterized by the opening moves 1.d4 c5 2.d5